The Greek football champions are the annual winners of Super League Greece, the highest professional football league in Greece. Officially the title has been contested since the season 1927–28, in various forms of competition.

Until 1958–59, in what was called Panhellenic Championship, the regional champions formed a national group, from which the national champion was decided. In some occasions the title was decided in a final between regional champions. Since 1959–60, the top league has been formed in its current form (see Greek football league system), with the top level being called Alpha Ethniki until 2005–06, when Super League Greece was founded, without any change in competition format. Olympiacos are the current champions, with 47 titles.

Performance by club (1928–)

Champions

The first attempts
(not counted by HFF)

SEGAS Championship and Greece FCA Championship
1905–06 to 1926–27 (not counted by HFF)

HFF Panhellenic Championship
1927–28 to 1958–59

Alpha Ethniki
1959–60 to 2005–06

Super League Greece
2006–07 to present

Top three ranking

Ranking by top three finishes in the top division of national football since 1959–60.

Ranking by top three finishes in the top division of national football since 1927–28.

References

External links
Hellenic Football Federation 

  
Greece
champions